Pine Bluff is the eleventh-largest city in the state of Arkansas and the county seat of Jefferson County. It is the principal city of the Pine Bluff Metropolitan Statistical Area and part of the Little Rock-North Little Rock-Pine Bluff Combined Statistical Area. The population of the city was 49,083 in the 2010 Census with 2019 estimates showing a decline to 41,474.

The city is situated in the Southeast section of the Arkansas Delta and straddles the Arkansas Timberlands region to its west.  Its topography is flat with wide expanses of farmland, similar to other places in the Delta Lowlands.  Pine Bluff has numerous creeks, streams, and bayous, including Bayou Bartholomew, the longest bayou in the world and the second most ecologically diverse stream in the United States. Large bodies of water include Lake Pine Bluff, Lake Langhofer (Slack Water Harbor), and the Arkansas River.

History

Pre-Columbian era to colonial era
The area along the Arkansas River had been inhabited for thousands of years by indigenous peoples of various cultures. They used the river for transportation as did European settlers after them, and for fishing.  By the time of encounter with Europeans, the historical Quapaw were the chief people in the area, having migrated from the Ohio River valley centuries before. 

The city of Pine Bluff was founded on a high bank of the Arkansas River heavily forested with tall pine trees.  The high ground furnished settlers a safe haven from annual flooding. Joseph Bonne, a Métis fur trader and trapper of mixed Quapaw and colonial French ancestry, settled on this bluff in 1819.

1824–1860: Antebellum era
After the Quapaw signed a treaty with the United States in 1824 relinquishing their title to all the lands which they claimed in Arkansas, many other American settlers began to join Bonne on the bluff. In 1829 Thomas Phillips claimed a half section of land where Pine Bluff is located. Jefferson County was established by the Territorial Legislature on November 2, 1829, and began functioning as a county April 19, 1830.

At the August 13, 1832, county election, the pine bluff settlement was chosen as the county seat.  The Quorum Court voted to name the village "Pine Bluff Town" on October 16, 1832.  Pine Bluff was incorporated January 8, 1839, by the order of County Judge Taylor. At the time, the village had about 50 residents.  Improved transportation aided in the growth of Pine Bluff during the 1840s and 1850s.

With its proximity to the Arkansas River, the small town served as a port for travel and shipping. Steamships provided the primary mode of transport, arriving from downriver ports such as New Orleans. From 1832–1838, Pine Bluff residents would see Native American migrants on the Trail of Tears waterway who were being forcibly removed by the US Army from the American Southeast to Indian Territory west of the Mississippi River.

From 1832–1858, Pine Bluff was also a station on the passage of Seminole and Black Seminoles, who were forcibly removed from Florida to the Territory. They included the legendary Black Seminole leader John Horse, who arrived in the city via the steamboat Swan in 1842.

1861–1900: Civil War, Reconstruction and beyond
Pine Bluff was prospering by the outbreak of the Civil War; most of its wealth was based on the commodity crop of cotton. This was cultivated on large plantations by hundreds of thousands of enslaved Africans throughout the state, but especially in the Delta. The city had one of the largest slave populations in the state by 1860, and Jefferson County, Arkansas was second in cotton production in the state. When Union forces occupied Little Rock, a group of Pine Bluff residents asked commanding Major General Frederick Steele to send Union forces to occupy their town to protect them from bands of Confederate bushwhackers. Union troops under Colonel Powell Clayton arrived September 17, 1863 and stayed until the war was over.

Confederate General J.S. Marmaduke tried to expel the Union Army in the Battle of Pine Bluff October 25, 1863, but was repulsed by a combined effort of soldiers and freedmen (former slaves freed by the Emancipation Proclamation).  In the final year of the war, the 1st Regiment Kansas Volunteer Infantry (Colored) (composed primarily of escaped slaves from Arkansas and Missouri), was the first African-American regiment in the civil war to go into combat. It was dispatched to guard Pine Bluff and was eventually mustered out there.

Because of the Union forces, Pine Bluff attracted many refugees and freedmen after the Emancipation Proclamation was issued in early 1863. The Union forces set up a contraband camp there to house the runaway slaves and refugees behind Confederate lines. After the war, freed slaves worked with the American Missionary Association to start schools for the education of blacks, who had been prohibited from learning to read and write by southern laws. Both adults and children eagerly started learning. By September 1872, Professor Joseph C. Corbin opened the Branch Normal School of the Arkansas Industrial University, a historically black college. Founded as Arkansas's first black public college, today it is the University of Arkansas at Pine Bluff.

Pine Bluff and the region suffered lasting effects from defeat, the aftermath of war, and the trauma of slavery and exploitation. Recovery was slow at first. Construction of railroads improved access to markets, and with increased production of cotton as more plantations were reactivated, the economy began to recover. The first railroad reached Pine Bluff in December 1873. This same year Pine Bluff's first utility was formed when Pine Bluff Gas Company began furnishing manufactured gas from coke fuel for lighting purposes. The state's economy remained highly dependent on cotton and agriculture, which suffered a decline through the 19th century.

As personal fortunes increased from the 1870s onward, community leaders constructed large Victorian-style homes west of Main Street. Meanwhile, the Reconstruction era of the 1870s brought a stark mix of progress and challenge for African Americans. Most blacks joined the Republican Party, and several were elected in Pine Bluff to county offices and the state legislature for the first time in history. Several black-owned businesses were also opened, including banks, bars, barbershops, and other establishments. But in postwar violence in 1866, an altercation with whites ensued at a refugee camp, and 24 black men, women and children were found hanging from trees in one of the worst mass lynchings in U.S. history.

The rate of lynchings of black males was high across the South during this period of social tensions and white resistance to Reconstruction. Armistad Johnson was lynched in 1889, and John Kelly and Gulbert Harris in 1892 in front of the Jefferson County Courthouse, after a mob of hundreds rapidly escalated to thousands of whites vehemently demanding execution, despite Kelly's pleas of innocence and lack of trial. The angry mob eventually forced over his custody from an Officer adamantly attempting to deliver the suspect to the jail house, then the crowd watched enthusiastically as he was hung and riddled with bullets. That same year the state adopted a poll tax amendment that disenfranchised many African-American and poor white voters. The Election Law of 1891 had already made voting more difficult and also caused voter rolls to decrease. With the Democratic Party consolidating its power in what became a one-party state, the atmosphere was grim toward the end of the 19th century for many African Americans. Democrats imposed legal segregation and other Jim Crow laws.

Bishop Henry McNeal Turner's  "Back to Africa" movement attracted numbers of local African-American residents who purchased tickets and/or sought information on emigration (Arkansas had 650 emigrants depart to the colony of Liberia in West Africa; more than from any other state in the United States. The majority of these emigrants came from the black-majority Jefferson, St. Francis, Pulaski, Pope, and Conway counties.

According to historian James Leslie, Pine Bluff entered its "Golden Era" in the 1880s. Cotton production and river commerce helped the city draw industries, public institutions and residents to the area, making it by 1890 the state's third-largest city. The first telephone system was placed in service March 31, 1883. Wiley Jones, a freedman who achieved wealth by his own business, built the first mule-drawn, street-car line in October 1886. The first light, power and water plant was completed in 1887; a more dependable light and water system was put in place in 1912. Throughout the 1880s and 1890s, economic expansion was also fueled by the growing lumber industry in the region.

1900–1941: 1900 through the Great Depression
Situated on the Arkansas River, Pine Bluff depended on river traffic and trade.  Community leaders were concerned that the main channel would leave the city.  The United States Army Corps of Engineers built a levee opposite Pine Bluff to try to keep the river flowing by the city. 

During a later flood, the main channel of the river moved away from the city, leaving a small oxbow lake (later expanded into Lake Pine Bluff).   River traffic diminished, even as the river was a barrier separating one part of the county from the other.  After many years of regional haggling, because the bond issue involved raised taxes, the county built the Free Bridge, which opened in 1914.  For the first time, it united the county on a permanent basis. 

African Americans in Pine Bluff were damaged by the state's disfranchisement in 1891–1892 and exclusion from the political system. But they continued to work for their rights; they joined activists in Little Rock and Hot Springs in a sustained boycott of streetcars, protesting passage in 1903 of the Segregated Streetcar Act, part of a series of Jim Crow laws passed by the white-dominated legislature. They did not achieve change then.

Development in the city's business district grew rapidly. The Masonic Lodge, built by and for the African-American chapter in the city, was the tallest building in Pine Bluff when completed in 1904.  The Hotel Pines, constructed in 1912, had an intricate marble interior and classical design, and was considered one of Arkansas' showcase hotels. The 1,500-seat Saenger Theater, built in 1924, was one of the largest such facilities in the state; it operated the state's largest pipe organ. When Dollarway Road was completed in 1914, it was the longest continuous stretch of concrete road in the United States. The first radio station (WOK) broadcast in Arkansas occurred in Pine Bluff on February 18, 1922.

Two natural disasters had devastating effects on the area's economy. The first was the Great Flood of 1927, a 100-year flood. Due to levee breaks, most of northern and southeastern Jefferson County were flooded. The severe drought of 1930 caused another failure of crops, adding to the problems of economic conditions during the Great Depression. Pine Bluff residents scrambled to survive. In 1930, two of the larger banks failed.

The state's highway construction program in the later 1920s and early 1930s, facilitating trade between Pine Bluff and other communities throughout southeast Arkansas, was critical to Jefferson County, too.  After the inauguration of President Franklin D. Roosevelt in 1933, he launched many government programs to benefit local communities.  Through the Works Progress Administration (WPA) and public works funding, Pine Bluff built new schools and a football stadium, and developed Oakland Park as its first major recreation facility.  To encourage diversification in agriculture, the county built a stockyard in 1936 to serve as a sales outlet for farmers' livestock.

From 1936–1938, the WPA through the Federal Writers Project initiated a project to collect and publish oral histories of former slaves.  Writers were sent throughout the South to interview former slaves, most of whom had been children before the Civil War. When the project was complete, Arkansas residents had contributed more oral slave histories (approximately 780) than any other state, although Arkansas' slave population was less than those of neighboring Deep South states. African-American residents of Pine Bluff/Jefferson County contributed more oral interviews of Arkansas-born slaves than any other city/county in the state.  The city served to compile a valuable storehouse of oral slave narrative material.

During the 1933 Mississippi River flood, country singer Johnny Cash evacuated to Pine Bluff.

1941–1960: World War II and economic diversification

World War II brought profound changes to Pine Bluff and its agriculture, timber and railroad-oriented economy.  The Army built Grider Field Airport which housed the Pine Bluff School of Aviation and furnished flight training for air cadets for the Army Air Corps. At one time 275 aircraft were being used to train 758 pilots.  Approximately 9,000 pilots had been trained by the time the school closed in October 1944.

The Army broke ground for the Pine Bluff Arsenal on December 2, 1941, on  bought north of the city.  The arsenal and Grider Field changed Pine Bluff to a more diversified economy with a mixture of industry and agriculture. The addition of small companies to the industrial base helped the economy remain steady in the late 1940s.   Defense spending in association with the Korean War was a stabilizing factor after 1950.

In 1957, Richard Anderson announced the construction of a kraft paper mill north of the city.  International Paper Co. shortly afterward bought a plant site five miles east of Pine Bluff.  Residential developments followed for expected workers. The next year young minister Martin Luther King Jr. addressed students at the commencement program for Arkansas AM&N College (now the University of Arkansas at Pine Bluff).

1960–present: The modern era
The decade of the 1960s brought heightened activism in the civil rights movement: through boycotts and demonstrations, African Americans demanded an end to segregated public facilities and jobs. Some whites responded with violence, attacking demonstrators, and bombing a black church in Pine Bluff in 1963. Some civil rights demonstrators were shot. Local leaders worked tirelessly, at times enlisting the support of national figures such as Dick Gregory and Stokely Carmichael, to help bring about change over the period. Voter registration drives that enabled increased black political participation, selective buying campaigns, student protests, and a desire among white local business leaders to avoid damaging negative media portrayals in the national media led to reforms in public accommodations.

During the 1960s and 1970s, major construction projects in the region included private and public sponsors: Jefferson Hospital (now Jefferson Regional Medical Center), the dams of the McClellan-Kerr Navigation System on the Arkansas River (which was diverted from the city to create Lake Langhofer), a Federal building, the Pine Bluff Convention Center complex including The Royal Arkansas Hotel & Suites, Pine Bluff Regional Park, two industrial parks and several large churches.

The 1980s and 1990s brought a number of significant construction projects.  Benny Scallion Park was created, named for the alderman who brought a Japanese garden to the Pine Bluff Civic Center. The city has not maintained the garden, but a small plaque remains.  In the late 1980s, The Pines, the first large, enclosed shopping center, was constructed on the east side of the city.  The mall attracted increased shopping traffic from southeast Arkansas. 

The most important construction project of the 1990s was completion of a southern bypass, designated part of Interstate 530.  In addition, a highway and bridge across Lock and Dam #4 were completed, providing another link between farm areas in northeastern Jefferson County and the transportation system radiating from Pine Bluff.  Through a private matching grant, a multimillion-dollar Arts and Science Center for Southeast Arkansas was completed downtown in 1994.

In 2000, construction was completed on the  Donald W. Reynolds Community Services Center. Carl Redus became the first African American mayor in the city's history in 2005. The University of Arkansas at Pine Bluff recently opened a $3 million business incubator in downtown Pine Bluff.  Also, a new $2 million farmers market pavilion was opened in 2010 on Lake Pine Bluff in downtown Pine Bluff.

Shirley Washington is the first female African American mayor. She was elected in 2016.

Beginning around 2020, Utah based entrepreneur John Fenley, owner of the music streaming service Murfie, began buying properties in Pine Bluff for redevelopment.

Geography

Pine Bluff is on the Arkansas River; the community was named for a bluff along that river. Both Lake Pine Bluff and Lake Langhofer are situated within the city limits, as these are bodies of water which are remnants of the historical Arkansas River channel. (The former is a man-made expansion of a natural oxbow; the latter was created by diking the old channel after a man-made diversion.) Consequently, the Mississippi Alluvial Plain (or the Arkansas Delta) runs well into the city with Bayou Bartholomew picking up the western border as a line of demarcation between the Arkansas Delta and the Arkansas Timberlands.

A series of levees and dams surrounds the area to provide for flood control and protect from channel shift. One of the world's longest individual levees at 380 miles runs from Pine Bluff to Venice, Louisiana.

Metropolitan statistical area

Pine Bluff is the largest city in a three-county MSA as defined by the U.S. Census Bureau including Jefferson, Cleveland, and Lincoln counties. The Pine Bluff MSA population in 2000 was 107,341 people. The Pine Bluff MSA population in 2007 dropped to 101,484. Pine Bluff was the fastest-declining Arkansas MSA from 2000–2007. The Pine Bluff area is also a component of the Little Rock-North Little Rock-Pine Bluff Combined Statistical Area which had a population of 902,443 people in the 2014 U.S. census estimate.

Climate

Demographics

2020 census

As of the 2020 United States census, there were 40,244 people, and 15,043 households.

2010 census
As of the census of 2010, there were 49,083 people, 18,071 households, and 11,594 families residing in the city. The racial makeup of the city was 75.6% Black or African American, 21.8% White, 0.2% Native American, 0.63% Asian, 0.01% Pacific Islander, 0.68% from other races, and 1.1% from two or more races. 1.5% of the population were Latino of any race.

There were 18,071 households, out of which 28.8% had children under the age of 18 living with them, 31.3% were married couples living together, 27.7% had a female householder with no husband present, and 35.8% were non-families. 31.3% of all households were made up of individuals, and 10.6% had someone living alone who was 65 years of age or older. The average household size was 2.49 and the average family size was 3.14.

In the city, the population was spread out, with 25.5% under the age of 18, 13.4% from 18 to 24, 24.3% from 25 to 44, 24.4% from 45 to 64, and 12.4% who were 65 years of age or older. The median age was 33.4 years. For every 100 females, there were 90.6 males. For every 100 females age 18 and over, there were 85.6 males.

The median income for a household in the city was $30,415, and the median income for a family was $39,993. Males had a median income of $38,333 versus $28,936 for females. The per capita income for the city was $17,334. About 24.3% of families and 30.6% of the population were below the poverty line, including 45.6% of those under age 18 and 13.7% of those age 65 or over.

Crime 
Pine Bluff had 23 homicides in 2021. Pine Bluff had 23 murders in 2020 - a rate of 56.5 murders per 100,000 people. The national average was 6.5 murders per 100,000 people in 2020.

Economy
Jefferson County is located in the heart of a rich agricultural area in the Arkansas River Basin. The leading products include cotton, soybeans, cattle, rice, poultry, timber and catfish. 

Major area employers include Jefferson Regional Medical Center, Simmons First National Corp., Tyson Foods, Evergreen Packaging, the Pine Bluff Arsenal and the Union Pacific Railroad. It is the large number of paper mills in the area that give Pine Bluff its, at times, distinctive odor, a feature known prominently among Arkansans.

In 2009, Pine Bluff was included on the Forbes list of America's 10 most impoverished cities.

Saracen Casino Resort in Pine Bluff was the first purpose-built casino in Arkansas.  Completed in 2020 at a cost of $350 million, it will employ over 1,100 full-time staff.

Arts and culture

The Pine Bluff Convention Center is one of the state's largest meeting facilities. The Arts and Science Center features theatrical performances and workshops for children and adults. Pine Bluff did also boast the only Band Museum in the country but it has closed.  Other areas of interest include downtown murals depicting the history of Pine Bluff, the Pine Bluff/Jefferson County Historical Museum, Arkansas Entertainers Hall of Fame and the Arkansas Railroad Museum.

Annual cultural events
 King Cotton Classic- Running from 1982 to 1999, the King Cotton Classic was one of the premier high school basketball tournaments in the country. It featured many future NBA players, including Corliss Williamson and Jason Kidd.The King Cotton Holiday Classic returned to the Pine Bluff Convention Center on December 27, 2018, as part of Go Forward Pine Bluff's Delta Celebration Series of Festivals and Events. Headed by Sam Glover with hopes of giving the city pride and the people things to do while in the city. The revived tournament featured eight teams, and the Pine Bluff Convention Center Arena is set to undergo a half-million-dollar renovation

Government

The City of Pine Bluff is governed by the mayor–council government system, with the mayor, city attorney, city clerk and treasurer are all elected at large. The Pine Bluff City Council is the legislative body of the city. This group is constituted of eight members, with two members representing each of the city's four wards. Each council member serves a four-year term, and elections are staggered every two years. Meetings of the city council are held in the Pine Bluff City Council Chambers on the first and third Monday of every month unless otherwise scheduled.

The city also has ten commissions for citizens to serve upon, with approval required by both the mayor and city council. They are: Advertising and Promotion, Aviation, Civic Auditorium Complex, Civil Service, Historic District, Historical Railroad Preservation, Parks and Recreation, Pine Bluff / Jefferson County Port Authority, Planning and Wastewater Utility. The city also has four boards and one commission that fills their own vacancies: Arkansas River Regional Intermodal Facilities Board, Arts and Science Center for Southeast Arkansas Board of Trustees, Cemetery Committee, Library Board and Taylor Field Operations Facilities Board.

As the county seat of Jefferson County, Pine Bluff also hosts all functions of county government at the Jefferson County Courthouse in downtown Pine Bluff.

Education

The University of Arkansas at Pine Bluff (UAPB) is the second oldest public educational institution in the state of Arkansas, and the oldest with a black heritage. It maintains one of the nation's few aquaculture research programs and the only one in the state of Arkansas. It also houses the University Museum and Cultural Center dedicated to preserving the history of UAPB and the Arkansas Delta.

The newly accredited Southeast Arkansas College features technical career programs as well as a 2-year college curriculum.

Pine Bluff is served by three school districts: Pine Bluff School District, Watson Chapel School District, and White Hall School District, as well as a number of charter schools and the Ridgeway Christian School also serve the city.

The Main Library of the Pine Bluff and Jefferson County Library System contains an extensive genealogy collection, including the online obituary index of the Pine Bluff Commercial, Arkansas census records, and digital collections, which consists of many county and city records for much of southeast Arkansas. In addition to downtown Pine Bluff's Main Library, PBJCLS branch libraries can also be found in the city's Watson Chapel area, as well as in White Hall, Redfield, and Altheimer.

Colleges and universities
 University of Arkansas at Pine Bluff
 Southeast Arkansas College

Public schools
 Pine Bluff School District, including Pine Bluff High School and Dollarway High School
 Watson Chapel School District, including Watson Chapel High School
 White Hall School District includes parts of Pine Bluff; White Hall High School is in neighboring White Hall.
Prior to integration, black students attended separate, segregated schools. These included Merrill High School, Townsend Park High School, Coleman High School, and Southeast High School.

In December 2020 the Arkansas State Board of Education ruled that the Dollarway School District should merge into the Pine Bluff School District as of July 1, 2021. According to the consolidation plan, all schools of the two districts will continue to operate post-merger. Accordingly the attendance boundary maps of the respective schools remained the same for the 2021-2022 school year, and all DSD territory went into the PBSD territory. The exception was with the pre-kindergarten levels, as all PBSD areas are now assigned to Forrest Park/Greenville School, including the territory from the former Dollarway district. Dollarway High will close in 2023.

Private schools
There are two private schools in Pine Bluff, Ridgway Christian School (K3–12th) and Maranatha Baptist Academy K3-12.

The city formerly hosted Catholic schools:
 St. Joseph Catholic School – Grades 5–12, opened in 1993, closed in 2013
 St. Peter's Catholic School – The first school in Arkansas for black children to be established, was established in 1889 by St. Joseph Church Pastor Monsignor John Michael "J.M." Lucey as the Colored Industrial Institute and in 1897 became St. Peter Academy a.k.a. St. Peter High School. It closed in 1975, and reopened as an elementary school (Grades Preschool through 6) operated by the School Sisters of Notre Dame in 1985. It closed permanently in 2012. It was the last Catholic school established for black students in the State of Arkansas.
 St. Raphael School – A majority black school, it closed in 1960

Public libraries
The Pine Bluff and Jefferson County Library System maintains its main library in the Civic Center in downtown. The city received its first library in 1913. The library system also operates the Watson Chapel Dave Burdick Library in the Watson Chapel neighborhood.

Infrastructure

Highways 
  Interstate 530
  US Route 63
  US Route 65
  US Route 79
  U.S. Highway 270
  U.S. Highway 425
  Highway 15
  Highway 54
  Highway 81
  Highway 190
  Highway 365

Pine Bluff is served by a network of five U.S. and five state highways radiating from the city. Interstate 530, formerly part of US 65, connects Little Rock to southeast Pine Bluff. Multiple Interstates can be accessed in approximately 40 minutes from any point in the city.  Interstate 530 Northwest  (44Miles) (71 km) To Little Rock, Arkansas .  U.S. Route 65 Southeast (83 Miles)  (134 km) To Lake Village, Arkansas .  Southeast (89miles) (137Km To Greenville Bridge . U.S. Route 425  South (114Miles) (183 km )Bastrop, Louisiana

Water 
Located on the navigable Arkansas River, with a slackwater harbor, Pine Bluff is accessible by water via the Port of Pine Bluff, the anchor of the city's Harbor Industrial District.

Air 
Daily commercial air freight and passenger services, along with scheduled commuter flights, are available at the Clinton National Airport (formerly Little Rock National Airport), Adams Field, (LIT), some 40 minutes driving time from Pine Bluff via Interstate 530 and interstate connectors.

Pine Bluff's municipal airport, Grider Field (PBF), is located four miles southeast of the city.  The airport serves as home base for corporate and general aviation aircraft. Charter, air ambulance and cargo airline services are also available.

Buses 
Royal Coach Lines offers local access to intrastate, regional, and charter services.

The city-owned Pine Bluff Transit operates six routes on a 12-hour/day, weekday basis, to various points including government, medical, educational and shopping centers.  Two of the buses have professional-quality murals advertising the University of Arkansas at Pine Bluff.

Railroad 

Current freight rail service to and through Pine Bluff is provided by the Union Pacific Railroad.

Correctional facilities 
In 1972, the City of Pine Bluff and the "Fifty for the Future," a business leader group, donated  of land to the Arkansas Department of Correction (ADC). This parcel was developed as the Pine Bluff Complex.

Since 1979 it has included the ADC state headquarters; the administrative Annex East is on Harding Avenue south of city hall.  The Ester Unit (formerly the Diagnostic Unit), the Pine Bluff Unit, and the Randall L. Williams Correctional Facility are in the "Pine Bluff Complex," as are the headquarters of the Arkansas Correctional School system.

The ADC Southeast Arkansas Community Corrections Center is in Pine Bluff.

Utilities

Water 
Liberty Utilities (formerly United Water), a subsidiary of Algonquin Power & Utilities, a privately held company, treats potable water and operates the water distribution system in Pine Bluff (including Watson Chapel), as well as Hardin, Ladd, and White Hall. This partnership began in 1942 between the City of Pine Bluff and Arkansas Municipal Water Company, which has been acquired and merged to become Liberty Utilities.

Each plant uses a process of pre-chlorination, aeration, filtration, and chlorine residual. Hydrofluosilic acid and zinc orthophosphate are also added in addition to chlorine. The water is then distributed to approximately serving over 18,000 customers via  of water distribution mains. A Source Water Vulnerability Assessment was conducted by the Arkansas Department of Health in 2013; it concluded that Pine Bluff's water supply is at medium susceptibility to contamination

Wastewater 
The Pine Bluff Wastewater Utility provides operation and maintenance of the city's municipally owned sewage collection and conveyance system. This facility treats and discharges treated effluent in accordance with a permit issued by the Arkansas Department of Environmental Quality (ADEQ).

The utility has been awarded by the National Association of Clean Water Agencies for its performance. In an Enforcement Compliance review completed in March 2014, it was noted that zero permit violations had occurred within the past three years.

Parks and recreation
Townsend Park was built on a  plot of land meant for a park for black people. The land was donated by the president of the Arkansas Agricultural, Mechanical, and Normal College to the state government. It was named after Merrill High School principal William J. Townsend.

Notable people

 Blanch Ackers, painter
 Larry D. Alexander, visual artist, writer,
 Broncho Billy Anderson, actor, honorary Academy Award winner
 John Barfield, Major League Baseball player
 Mark Bradley, National Football League player
 Clifton R. Breckinridge, U.S. Representative from Arkansas
 Big Bill Broonzy, musician, member of Blues Hall of Fame
 Charles Brown, Rock and Roll Hall of Fame inductee, blues musician/singer
 Jim Ed Brown, country music artist
 The Browns, country music trio
 Bill Carr, 1932 Olympic double gold medalist
 Joe Barry Carroll, basketball player, top pick of 1980 NBA Draft
 Monte Coleman, NFL player, University of Arkansas at Pine Bluff head coach
 Junior Collins, jazz musician
 Joseph Carter Corbin, Educator, first principal of the University of Arkansas at Pine Bluff, principal of Merrill High School
 Harvey C. Couch, founder, Arkansas Power & Light
 CeDell Davis, blues musician
 Janette Davis, singer
 L. Clifford Davis, civil rights attorney, judge
 Larry Davis, blues musician
 The Buddy Deane Show, national TV program of local radio DJ
 Jay Dickey, lawyer and politician
 Jeff Donaldson, visual artist, founder AfriCOBRA
 Marty Embry, professional basketball player, chef, author
 Kenneth B. Ferguson, Democratic member of Arkansas House of Representatives for Jefferson and Lincoln counties since 2015
 Stephanie Flowers, African-American Democratic member of Arkansas State Senate since 2011; former member of Arkansas House of Representatives; Pine Bluff lawyer
 Vivian Flowers, African-American Democratic member of Arkansas House of Representatives from Pine Bluff since 2015; diversity officer at UAMS Medical Center in Little Rock
 Rodney Shelton Foss, possibly first American killed in World War II
 Charles Greene, Olympic gold medalist, track & field
 George W. Haley, U.S. ambassador
 Isaac Scott Hathaway, visual artist, first African American to create a coin for the U.S. Treasury
 George Edmund Haynes, first executive director of National Urban League, first African-American to receive PhD from Columbia
 Chester Himes, novelist,
 George Howard, Jr., federal judge
 Mike Huckabee (born 1955), 44th Governor of Arkansas
 Torii Hunter, Major League Baseball player, 5-time All-Star
 Don Hutson, member of College and Pro Football Hall of Fame
 Bobby Hutton, founding member of Black Panther Party
 George G.M. James, author
 Joseph Jarman, jazz saxophonist
 Charles Johnson, Negro league baseball player
 David Johnson, football player
 Kenneth Johnson, television producer
 Theresa A. Jones, neuroscientist
 E. Fay Jones, architect and designer
 Camille Keaton, actress
 Carl Kidd, player in Canadian and National Football Leagues
 Lafayette Lever, NBA player
 Henry Jackson Lewis, political cartoonist
 Kay Linaker, actress
 Dallas Long, Olympic gold medalist
 Martell Mallett, player in Canadian and National Football Leagues
 Peter McGehee, novelist
 Dwight McKissic, Southern Baptist minister
 Carl McVoy, rock 'n' roll pianist/vocalist
 Chris Mercer, the first African-American deputy state prosecutor in the South, one of the "six pioneers" who integrated the University of Arkansas Law School.
 Constance Merritt, poet
 Martha Mitchell, wife of U.S. Attorney General John N. Mitchell
 Raye Montague, US Navy engineer, created first computer generated draft of a naval ship
 Mary Mouser, actress known for the role of Samantha LaRusso in Cobra Kai
 Bitsy Mullins, jazz trumpeter
 Smokie Norful, Grammy Award-winning gospel singer
 Freeman Harrison Owens, inventor
 Rita Panahi, conservative commentator and host on Sky News Australia 
 Ben Pearson, bowyer
 Edward J. Perkins, U.S. ambassador
 Elizabeth Rice, actress
 Andree Layton Roaf, justice of Arkansas Supreme Court (mother of Wille Roaf)
 Willie Roaf, NFL Hall of Famer (son of Andree Layton Roaf)
 John Roane (1817–1867), 4th Governor of Arkansas; Brigadier General in provisional Army of Confederate States
 Bobby Rush, musician, member of Blues Hall of Fame
 William Seawell, brigadier general in U.S. Air Force
 Peggy Shannon, actress
 Les Spann, jazz musician
 Jeremy Sprinkle, (White Hall) tight end for NFL's Washington Commanders
 Katherine Stinson, aviator
 James L. Stone, Medal of Honor recipient
 Francis Cecil Sumner, psychologist
 Jerry Taylor, businessman, legislator, Mayor of Pine Bluff
 Clark Terry, Grammy Award-winning jazz musician
 Sue Bailey Thurman, African-American author, lecturer, and historian
 Krista White, winner of America's Next Top Model Cycle 14
 Reggie Wilkes, football player, financial advisor
 J. Mayo Williams, blues/gospel/jazz producer, member of Blues Hall of Fame

Sister city
 Bandō, Ibaraki, Japan– sister city since October 9, 1989

See also
 Hestand Stadium
 List of municipalities in Arkansas
 National Register of Historic Places listings in Jefferson County, Arkansas

References

Further reading

External links

 
 
 

 
1839 establishments in Arkansas
Arkansas in the American Civil War
Arkansas populated places on the Arkansas River
Cities in Arkansas
Cities in Jefferson County, Arkansas

County seats in Arkansas
Populated places established in 1839